TI, ti, and variants may refer to:

Arts and entertainment 
 Ti/Si, the seventh syllable in the solfège technique
 The International (Dota 2), an annual esports tournament for the video game, Dota 2
 Twilight Imperium, a game

Businesses and organizations
 TI-class supertankers, ultra-large tanker ships operated by Tankers International 
 Texas Instruments, an American electronics company
 Telecom Italia, an Italian telecommunications company
 TI Group, previously Tube Investments, an English engineering company 
 Therapeutics Initiative, an evidence based medication evaluation organization
 Tiger Inn, a Princeton University eating club
 Toastmasters International, an international public speaking organization
 Tol Air (IATA airline designator TI)
 Tailwind Airlines, IATA code
 Transparency International, an international organisation devoted to fighting corruption
 Treasure Island Hotel and Casino, an American hotel and casino resort on the Las Vegas Strip

People
 Ti, a high-status official during the Fifth Dynasty of Egypt
 Ti. for Tiberius, a Roman given name shared by several people
 T.I. (born 1980), American rapper and actor; real name Clifford Harris
 Stephen Michael, Australian rules footballer
 TI or targeted individual, self-name for the category of delusional people who claim to be targets of electronic harassment
 Ti, Bonnie Nettles, religious leader

Places
 Ti, Oklahoma, US
 Thursday Island, Torres Strait
 Ticino, a canton (federated state) of Switzerland

Science, technology, and mathematics

Biology and medicine
 Cabbage tree (New Zealand), called "tī kouka"
 Terminal ileum, the last part of the small intestine
 Ti or Tī, a generic name in Polynesian languages for plants of the genus Cordyline, including:
 Cordyline fruticosa, Tī, Tī pore (Māori), Kī (Hawaiian), a widely cultivated plant throughout Polynesia
 Cordyline australis (Tī kōuka or Cabbage tree, New Zealand)
 Cordyline banksii (Tī ngahere or Forest cabbage tree, New Zealand)
 Cordyline indivisa (Tī toī, tōī or Mountain cabbage tree, New Zealand)
 Cordyline obtecta (Tī, Norfolk Island cabbage tree, Three Kings cabbage tree, Norfolk Island and New Zealand)
 Cordyline pumilio (Tī rauriki, Tī koraha or Dwarf cabbage tree, New Zealand)
 Therapeutic index
 Tricuspid insufficiency, a leakage of blood within the heart

Computing
 Ti (prefix symbol), the prefix symbol of the binary unit prefix tebi
 Technical informatics, a subclass of computer engineering
 Acronis True Image, a disk imaging program

Other uses in science, technology, and mathematics
 Topological insulator
 Thermal instability
 Thermodynamic integration
 Titanium, symbol Ti, a chemical element
 Truncated icosahedron

Other uses
 Ti (concept), a term meaning "substance" (體) in Chinese
 TI (cuneiform), a sign in cuneiform writing
 Ti, Old Swedish spelling of Týr, deity of Norse mythology
 Tigrinya language (ISO 639-1 code "ti")
 ti (digraph), the characters 
 Tenant inducement, in commercial real estate

See also

 Di (disambiguation) for several Chinese concepts; "Ti" is the Wade–Giles equivalent of "Di"
 TL (disambiguation)
 T1 (disambiguation)